Licco Amar (4 December 1891 – 19 July 1959) was a Hungarian violinist.

Life 
Born in Budapest, Amar was the child of the merchant Michael Amar and Regina Strakosch, who came from North Macedonia. Amar studied with Emil Baré at the Franz Liszt Academy of Music in his native city and in 1911 he went to Berlin to study at the Universität der Künste Berlin with Henri Marteau. From 1912 to 1924, Marteau accepted him as second violinist in his String Quartet, in which the cellist Hugo Becker also played. In 1912, Amar received the Mendelssohn Prize. He became concertmaster of the Berlin Philharmonic from 1916 to 1920 and changed to the Mannheim National Theatre from 1920 to 1923. His own string quartet, which he had founded in 1922 as the Amar Quartet, included Paul Hindemith as violist and, temporarily until its dissolution in 1929, Walter Kaspar, Rudolf Hindemith. For Hindemith's compositions,  who dedicated the Sonata op. 31,1 to him, he arranged several world premieres, e.g. at the Donaueschinger Musiktage, and Maurits Frank. He also supported the composer Erich Walter Sternberg. In 1925 he and Emmy Matterstock married.

After the 1933 seizure of power by the Nazis, he could no longer work in Germany for racist reasons, emigrated to France and from there in 1934 to Turkey, where he was able to teach at the conservatory in Ankara for twenty years from 1935. In 1957 he received an engagement by the Hochschule für Musik Freiburg.

Amar died in Freiburg im Breisgau at the age of 68.

Further reading 
 Lemma in MGG 1, p. 571f (Giselher Schubert)
  (ed.): Kurzbiographien zur Geschichte der Juden 1918–1945. Published by the Leo Baeck Institute, Jerusalem. Saur, Munich 1988, .
 Werner Röder; Herbert A. Strauss, (ed.), Biographisches Handbuch der deutschsprachigen Emigration nach 1933 / International Biographical Dictionary of Central European Emigrés 1933–1945. Vol II, 1 Munich : Saur 1983 , .
 Salomon Wininger: Große jüdische National-Biographie.<ref>[https://www.worldcat.org/oclc/476584360 Große jüdische National-Biographie'] on WorldCat</ref> Kraus Reprint, Nendeln 1979,  (Nachdr. d. Ausg. Czernowitz 1925). Vol. 7, .
 Arnold Reisman: Post-Ottoman Turkey : classical European music & opera. (Nachdr. d. Ausg. Czernowitz 1925). Vol. 7, .
 Angelika Rieber: "Hier gibt es eine Welt aufzubauen." Biographisches zu dem Geiger Licco Amar, in Hindemith-Jahrbuch, Mainz 2009.
 Berliner Philharmoniker: Variationen mit Orchester – 125 Jahre Berliner Philharmoniker''. vol. 2, Biografien und Konzerte, Verlag Henschel, May 2007,

References

External links 
 
 
 

1891 births
1959 deaths
Hungarian violinists
Academic staff of the Hochschule für Musik Freiburg
Jewish emigrants from Nazi Germany to France
Commanders Crosses of the Order of Merit of the Federal Republic of Germany
Concertmasters
Musicians from Budapest